The Battle of the Somme most commonly refers to the Anglo-French offensive in 1916 during World War I.

The campaign was later divided into a series of battles. According to official nomenclature, two offensives in 1918 also use this name:

 the German offensive codenamed Operation Michael, known by the British as the First Battle of the Somme, 1918.
 the Second Battle of the Somme (1918), the second phase of the final British offensive of the war

Battle of the Somme may otherwise refer to:

 The Battle of the Somme (film)'', a 1916 documentary and propaganda film